The Columbia Senators was the first name of an American minor league baseball franchise representing Columbia, South Carolina, in the original South Atlantic League. Currently, Columbia is home of the Columbia Fireflies in the South Atlantic League.

History before 1938
Columbia was represented in the SAL — popularly called the "Sally League" — as early as 1892 as the Senators, a reference to the city's status as capital of South Carolina.  It fielded Sally League teams from 1904–1917, 1919–1923 and 1925–1930 under nicknames such as the Skyscrapers, Gamecocks, Comers and Commies.  The SAL did not operate during 1918 at the height of World War I, and from 1931–1935 during the worst years of the Great Depression.  When the league revived in 1936, the Columbia Senators also returned to the field.  The team played at Capital City Park.

The franchise was renamed the Reds in 1938 when the Cincinnati Reds of Major League Baseball became its parent team. The team would be known as the Reds from 1938–1942, 1946–1955 and 1960–1961.

Longtime Cincinnati farm team
The SAL shut down again during World War II, but returned to professional baseball in 1946, and was upgraded from Class B to Class A, then a mid- to higher-level classification. The Columbia Reds continued as a Cincinnati affiliate through 1955, but, unlike its MLB parent, the team did not change its name to Redlegs during the mid-1950s. Some of Cincinnati's biggest stars of the 1950s (including Baseball Hall of Famer Frank Robinson, slugger Ted Kluszewski and longtime pitcher/broadcaster Joe Nuxhall) came through Columbia on their way to Major League prominence.  However, in 1956 Cincinnati shifted its Sally League affiliate to Savannah, and the Kansas City Athletics replaced them in Columbia with the team renamed the Columbia Gems.  The Gems lasted only two seasons before the league contracted from eight to six teams and both Columbia and Columbus, Georgia, lost their franchises for 1958.

Columbia was without professional baseball until 1960, when the Reds came back from Savannah for two seasons before affiliating with the Macon Peaches in 1962.  It never returned to the original Sally League (which became the Double-A Southern League in 1964) but joined the modern Class A South Atlantic League in 1983 with the Columbia Mets (1983–1992) and the Capital City Bombers (1993–2004).

The Columbia Reds captured two league playoff championships (1941; 1953) during their history. The 1952 edition, managed by Ernie White, won 100 of 154 regular season games, but was toppled in the first playoff round by Macon.

Notable alumni (1936–1961)

 
Hall of Fame alumni

 Frank Robinson (1954-1955) Inducted, 1982
Notable alumni

Bobby Adams
Joe Adcock
Jack Baldschun
Frank Baumholtz
Jimmy Bloodworth 
George Brunet 
Vic Davalillo
Sammy Ellis
Kirby Higbe 
Ted Kluszewski
Roy McMillan
Bob Nieman
Joe Nuxhall
Don Pavletich
Harry Perkowski
Wally Post
Chico Ruiz
Al Silvera
Johnny Temple
Gene Thompson
Clyde Vollmer
Herm Wehmeier

See also
Capital City Bombers
Columbia Mets

References

External links
Baseball Reference

Professional baseball teams in South Carolina
Boston Bees minor league affiliates
Cincinnati Reds minor league affiliates
Defunct minor league baseball teams
Kansas City Athletics minor league affiliates
Philadelphia Athletics minor league affiliates
Sports in Columbia, South Carolina
1936 establishments in South Carolina
Baseball teams established in 1936
Baseball teams disestablished in 1961
1961 disestablishments in South Carolina
South Atlantic League (1904–1963) teams
Defunct South Atlantic League teams